Francesco Cossu (11 January 1907 – 4 November 1986) was an Italian rower who competed in the 1932 Summer Olympics. In 1932 he won the bronze medal as member of the Italian boat in the coxless four competition.

References

External links
 

1907 births
1986 deaths
Italian male rowers
Olympic rowers of Italy
Rowers at the 1932 Summer Olympics
Olympic bronze medalists for Italy
Olympic medalists in rowing
Medalists at the 1932 Summer Olympics
European Rowing Championships medalists
20th-century Italian people